Pankaj Zaveri (14 January 1945 – 1 May 2020) was an Indian cricketer. He played in 58 first-class matches for Gujarat from 1965/66 to 1981/82.

See also
 List of Gujarat cricketers

References

External links
 

1945 births
2020 deaths
Indian cricketers
Gujarat cricketers
Cricketers from Ahmedabad